Easy Pieces is a 1985 album by Lloyd Cole

Variants of Easy Pieces include:

Film and TV
Five Easy Pieces 1970 American drama
Five Easy Pieces (1980 TV series) (輪流傳) Chinese TV series
Seven Easy Pieces DVD series of performances given by artist Marina Abramović in New York

Books
The Feynman Lectures on Physics (redirect from Six Easy Pieces)
Three Easy Pieces, Wright Morris
Five Easy Pieces, Geoffrey Hartman
Six Easy Pieces, novel by Walter Mosley

Music

Classical
Three Easy Pieces (Stravinsky) for piano, 4 hands 1914
Five Easy Pieces (Stravinsky) 4 hands 1917
Easy Pieces (3 pieces) 1933 John Cage
Easy Pieces (4 pieces), Op.1b Howard Blake
Two Easy Pieces (1951) Alan Bush
17 Easy Pieces, Op. 34 Mieczysław Weinberg
Children's Album: 24 Easy Pieces, for piano, Op. 39 Tchaikovsky 1878

Albums
Easy Pieces, album by Lloyd Cole and the Commotions 1985
Five Easy Pieces, Lateduster album 2002
Easy Pieces, Lateduster album 2004
Three Easy Pieces (Buffalo Tom album)
Ten Easy Pieces, album by American singer-songwriter Jimmy Webb, 1996
5 Easy Pieces (Scott Walker box set), anthology of Scott Walker 2003
Seven Easy Pieces (EP), The Detroit Cobras 2004